The deputy chief ministers of Bangsamoro are the second-highest executive officials of Bangsamoro, an autonomous region within the Philippines, just next to the chief minister.

Background

Function
The Bangsamoro Organic Law (BOL), mandates the appointment of two deputy chief ministers who are tasked to assist the chief minister of Bangsamoro. The chief minister nominates the deputies, with the Bangsamoro Parliament electing to confirm or deny nominations.

Deputy chief ministers are permitted to hold a cabinet position. In the case of death, permanent incapacity, or resignation of the chief minister of Bangsamoro, the deputy chief minister, more senior in age will act as the chief minister until the parliament elect a new chief minister, within 30 days from vacancy as mandated by law.

Eligibility
The deputies are required by law to hail from a subregion different from that of the chief minister. The BOL names three subregions for the purpose of the appointment of deputies, namely south-western Mindanao, north-central Mindanao, and south-central Mindanao, with the exact scope of the region to be determined by the parliament.

The first set of deputies did not exactly follow the subregion naming scheme as provided by the BOL. The first two holders were each referred to as "deputy for the mainland" and "deputy for the islands". The areas of jurisdiction is alternatively referred to as North Central Mindanao and South Western Mindanao respectively. The BOL also obliged the interim chief minister that the interim deputy chief ministers be members of the Bangsamoro Transition Authority.

List

Deputy for the Mainland

Deputy for the Islands

Notes

References

Vice offices
Government in Bangsamoro